Grupo Elektra is a Mexican financial and retailing corporation established by Hugo Salinas Price. The company has operations in Latin America and is the largest non-bank provider of cash advance services in the United States.

It is listed on the Bolsa Mexicana de Valores (ELEKTRA*) and on the Spanish Stock Market Latibex (XEKT).

The Group operates more than 7,000 points of contact in Mexico, the United States, Guatemala, Honduras, Peru, Panama and El Salvador. The company operates through two divisions to satisfy the needs of its customers: commercial and financial.

Commercial Division
Grupo Elektra offers appliances, consumer electronics, furniture, motorcycles, mobile phones, computers, as well as electronic money transfer business and extended warranties, among many other products.

Elektra is the most important store format of the company. It has 1,143 points of sale throughout Mexico and Central and South America, focused to underserved social classes. The groups older Salinas y Rocha store format has 51 stores and its target market is made of the middle class.

Grupo Elektra sells close to 1 of every 4 televisions commercialized in Mexico, 1 of every 5 refrigerators, 7 of every 10 motorcycles, and pays a substantial proportion of the electronic money transfers from the United States into Mexico.

Financial Division
It offers its services to sectors that have been underserved by traditional financial institutions through Banco Azteca, Seguros Azteca, Afore Azteca, Advance America and Punto Casa de Bolsa.

Banco Azteca 

Banco Azteca operates in Mexico, Guatemala, Honduras, El Salvador, Panama and Peru, and is the largest bank in Mexico in geographical coverage with more than 3,500 points of contact. Banco Azteca Mexico has more than 13 million of deposit accounts and a similar numbers of loan accounts.

Banco Azteca offers consumer and personal loans, credit cards, pawn lending, and group and commercial loans.

On the deposit side, the bank offers a variety of savings products for its target market, with interest-bearing accounts that can be opened with one peso and do not generate commissions.

According to the World Bank, Banco Azteca has a positive impact on the development of numerous communities through micro financing. In the 2014 Global Financial Development Report about Financial Inclusion, the World Bank indicated that after two years from the start of operations of Banco Azteca in 2002, personal income increased 7% in areas where branches were established, and unemployment decreased 1.4%, due to the increased access to credit, with lower interest rates, compared to other local and microfinance loan providers.

Also, World Bank reported the increase in income was due to the strengthening of small businesses as a result of larger access to funding, while the growth of companies generated jobs. As a result, these sources of work beneficiated low-income population segments that are the target market of Banco Azteca, which improved income distribution.

Advance America  
Advance America is a payday loan provider in the United States, founded in 1997. As of December 31, 2013, Advance America operated over 2,500 lending centers in 29 states and 18 centers in Canada.

Advance America's current President and CEO is Jim Ovenden. William Webster IV is chairman of the board.

Advance America provides its cash advances in small-denomination, short-term amounts. The advances are due on the customer's next payday.

Advance America does not franchise any of its centers in the United States or Canada and does not provide pawn lending. The company is a member of the Community Financial Services Association of America.

Others 

Seguros Azteca offers life and liability microinsurance that can be acquired at affordable prices in Mexico and Latin America. Afore Azteca offers pension fund management with the support of the extensive geographical coverage of Grupo Elektra. Advance America is a short-term non-bank loan provider in the United States and, Punto Casa de Bolsa offers financial brokerage services to the middle class of the population.

Finances

History 

 1906:
 Salinas y Rocha founded as a furniture store.
 1950:   
 Hugo Salinas Price creates Elektra.
 First Mexican company to manufacture televisions sets.
 1954: Starts selling merchandise on credit.
 1987: Ricardo B. Salinas is named CEO.
 1993: Begins offering electronic money transfer services.
 1997: Expansion into Latin America starts.
 1999: Retail chain Salinas y Rocha is acquired.
 2002: Banco Azteca Mexico starts operations.
 2003: Afore Azteca starts operating.
 2004: Seguros Azteca begins offering its services.
 2005: Assembly and selling of Italika-branded motorcycles starts.
 2008: During 2008, the company bought 28% of struggling retailer Circuit City. The company soon went bankrupt after being unable to find another buyer.
 2012:
 Advance America is acquired.
 Punto Casa de Bolsa starts operations.

References

External links

 Corporate website
 Official website

Financial services companies established in 1950
Retail companies established in 1950
Companies listed on the Mexican Stock Exchange
Companies listed on the Madrid Stock Exchange
Companies formerly listed on the New York Stock Exchange
Companies based in Mexico City
Grupo Salinas
Retail companies of Mexico
Mexican companies established in 1950
Conglomerate companies of Mexico
Mexican brands
Elektra